Alexandra Alexandrovna Timoshenko, or Olexandra Olexandrivna Tymoshenko, (born 18 February 1972) is a former Ukrainian individual rhythmic gymnast who competed for the Soviet Union. She is the 1992 Olympics champion, 1988 Olympics bronze medalist, 1989 World all-around champion, 1991 World all-around silver medalist and two time (1988, 1990) European all-around champion. Along with Tatiana Gutsu, and Oleh Kucherenko, Oleksandra Tymoshenko also was among the first Olympians in honor of which at the 1992 Olympics was raised the Ukrainian flag and played the Ukrainian anthem.

Career 
When Tymoshenko was seven, her father (a construction engineer) was invited to work in Kyiv. She started training in gymnastics in 1980 at age eight at the Deriugins School, coached by the mother/daughter combination of Albina and Irina Deriugina. She placed seventh at the 1987 European Junior Championships, her first major international result. At age 14, she became the Soviet junior champion and, shortly after, collected three medals at a European championships: a gold for the Rope, a silver for the Hoop and a bronze for the Ribbon. At a Soviet competition, she placed second behind the top Soviet competition, Marina Lobach of Belarus, and so won the right to go to the 1988 European championships.

At the 1988 European Championships in Helsinki, Finland, Tymoshenko shared the All-Around title with two Bulgarians, Elizabeth Koleva and Adriana Dunavska. There she also won three golds - Hoop, Clubs and Rope. Several months later she won the All-Around bronze at the Seoul Olympics, and after that she became the USSR All-Around champion for the first time.

Tymoshenko continued her rise in 1989, taking five out of six golds at the Sarajevo World Championships. Her streak would continue through numerous other international competitions, although she started to feel the pressure from up-and-coming teammates. She would grab her second European title in 1990, but spent the rest of the year struggling against the steadily rising Oksana Skaldina. In 1991, Timoshenko seemed poised to earn her second World title after a very strong early season. However, in Athens Timoshenko's difficulty level could not match Skaldina's and the former World champion had to settle for silver. At the event finals she was able to sweep the gold medals on all four apparatus.

The ex-USSR countries competed as the Unified Team at the 1992 Summer Olympics in Barcelona, Spain. Tymoshenko won the gold medal in All-around ahead of Skaldina.

Retirement 
Although the Ukrainian Federation tried to persuade her to continue after the 1992 Olympics, Timoshenko opted to retire from the sport at the age of 20. She enrolled in the Goethe Institute to study German language, while simultaneously completing her studies at the Kyiv University of Physical Culture and Sports. She spent some time coaching in Germany before getting married and making a permanent move to Vienna, Austria.

Detailed Olympic results

References

External links
 
 
 

1972 births
Living people
People from Bohuslav
Soviet rhythmic gymnasts
Ukrainian rhythmic gymnasts
Gymnasts at the 1988 Summer Olympics
Gymnasts at the 1992 Summer Olympics
Olympic gold medalists for the Unified Team
Olympic bronze medalists for the Soviet Union
Olympic gymnasts of the Soviet Union
Olympic gymnasts of the Unified Team
Deriugins Gymnasts
Olympic medalists in gymnastics
Medalists at the 1992 Summer Olympics
Medalists at the 1988 Summer Olympics
Medalists at the Rhythmic Gymnastics World Championships
Sportspeople from Kyiv Oblast